This is a list of all red cards shown during FIFA Confederations Cups; that is, the occasions when a player has been expelled from the game in a football FIFA Confederations Cup Finals match. As FIFA is the governing body of football, official red cards are only noted when FIFA recognised that a player was expelled or sent off in a match.

The first player dismissed in the FIFA Confederations Cup was Brian Quinn of the United States, playing against Saudi Arabia in the 1992 King Fahd Cup; the most recent was Gerard Piqué of Spain, playing against Brazil in the FIFA Confederations Cup.

Notable Confederations Cup red cards
 Brian Quinn was the first player to be sent off in a Confederations Cup match, playing for the United States on 15 October 1992 against Saudi Arabia.
 Australia's Mark Viduka received the quickest red card when he was sent off in the 24th minute in 1997.
 Four players have been sent off in the final. Argentina's José Chamot was the first in 1995, Australia's Viduka in 1997, Brazil's João Carlos in 1999, and Spain's Gerard Piqué in 2013.
 The most players sent off in one game is three. Three players were sent off for Egypt in a 5-1 loss against Saudi Arabia on 29 July 1999.
 Two countries lead the list of most red cards for a national team with Egypt and United States having five players dismissed.
 The most tournament with red cards is 1999, having six red cards.

List of FIFA Confederations Cup red cards

References

Red Cards